Julia Brueckler or Julia Brückler (born 28 November 1989) is an Austrian professional street skateboarder. She is regarded as one of the first female skateboarders in Austria. Her partner Cody McEntire is also a professional skateboarder.

Career 
Julia began pursuing her interest in skateboarding at the age of 12 after being inspired by her boys counterparts at the middle school who all played the sport enthusiastically. One of the boys in her middle school gave his board to her and other girls to try and master the sport. 

She made her X Games debut during the X Games Austin 2015. In September 2018, she won her first European Skateboarding Championships. She finished 7th at the X Games Minneapolis 2018.

Brueckler made her Olympic debut at the 2020 Summer Olympics in Tokyo, where skateboarding was featured in the Olympic program for the very first time. Prior to the Olympic Games, she was the 23rd ranked women's street skater in the World Skate Olympic World Skateboarding Rankings. She represented Austria in the women's street event and finished in the 18th place.

References

External links
 
 Julia Brueckler at The Boardr

1989 births
Living people
Austrian skateboarders
Austrian sportswomen
Female skateboarders
Olympic skateboarders of Austria
Skateboarders at the 2020 Summer Olympics
Sportspeople from Vienna